Major Tuddy is the mascot of the Washington Commanders of the National Football League (NFL). He is a large anthropomorphic pig who wears a combat helmet and team uniform. Introduced during the team's rebrand in 2022, he is a homage to The Hogs, Washington's famed offensive line in the 1980s. "Tuddy" is a slang term derived from the abbreviation of a touchdown (TD). He follows Peppa Pig and Miss Piggy on Twitter.

References

External links
 

National Football League mascots
Washington Commanders
Mascots introduced in 2022
Fictional pigs
Fictional soldiers